Penthe pimelia, the velvety bark beetle, is a species of polypore fungus beetle in the family Tetratomidae. It is found in North America.

This species appears very dark with a dark scutellum which distinguishes it from the only other species of Penthe in North America, Penthe obliqiuata, which exhibits a distinct, bright-orange scutellum.

References

Further reading

External links

 

Tenebrionoidea
Articles created by Qbugbot
Beetles described in 1801